Meneptila is a genus of moth in the family Cosmopterigidae. It contains only one species, Meneptila praedonia, which is found in India.

References

External links
Natural History Museum Lepidoptera genus database

Cosmopterigidae